Violator is a 2014 Philippine psychological horror film written and directed by Eduardo "Dodo" Dayao.  It stars Victor Neri, Anthony Falcon, RK Bagatsing, Timothy Mabalot, Andy Bais, and Joel Lamangan.  It premiered at the Cinema One Originals film festival, where it won Best Editing, Best Picture, Best Sound, and Best Supporting Actor for Bais.  At the Gawad Urian Awards, it won Best Sound and was nominated for Best Cinematography, Best Editing, and Best Supporting Actor for Lamangan.

Premise 
At the height of a super-typhoon that could well be the first wave of an impending Apocalypse, five men take refuge in a flooded-in police station and spend the rest of the night with a prisoner who may or may not be the Devil.

Cast 
 Victor Neri as Gilberto Pring
 Anthony Falcon as Lukas Manabat
 RK Bagatsing as Gabriel Ragas
 Timothy Mabalot as Nathan Winston Payumo
 Andy Bais as Vic
 Joel Lamangan as Benito Alano

Production 
Writer-director Dayao is a film critic, and Violator is his directorial debut.  He says the step was natural to him, though he accepts others find it less so.  When casting the film, Dayao consciously cast the actors against type.  All of the actors were his first choices, and they all took the roles that he desired.

Release 
Violator premiered on November 10, 2014, at the Cinema One Originals film festival.

Reception 
Derek Elley of Film Business Asia rated the film 6 out of 10 stars and, while calling it an impressive debut, wrote that it "is stronger on technique than actual content".  Richard Kuipers of Variety wrote, "This stylishly assembled Filipino chiller creates plenty of intrigue but can't quite deliver a knockout punch."  Michael Atkinson of The Village Voice called it "an apocalyptic creep-out as heavy with atmosphere and portent as a doomsday sermon".  Todd Brown of Twitch Film called it "a gorgeously executed and tightly controlled exercise in religious dread".

References

External links 
 

2014 films
2014 horror films
Philippine supernatural horror films
2010s Tagalog-language films
Apocalyptic films
Philippine psychological horror films
Religious horror films
2010s psychological horror films
2014 directorial debut films
2010s English-language films